Tíjola is a municipality of Almería province, in the autonomous community of Andalusia, Spain.

History
In antiquity, Tíjola was the Phoenician colony of Tagilit (or).

Demographics

References

Citations

Bibliography
 .

External links
  Tíjola - Sistema de Información Multiterritorial de Andalucía
  Tíjola - Diputación Provincial de Almería

Municipalities in the Province of Almería
Phoenician colonies in Spain